Monopole is the fifth studio album by British indie pop musical project White Town, released in 2011 through Bzangy Records.

Track listing

References

2011 albums
White Town albums
Alternative rock albums by British artists
Electronica albums by British artists